Your God may refer to:

"Your God", song by Stone Sour from Come What(ever) May 2006
"Your God", song by Behind the Sun (Dive album) 2004
"Your God", song by Low Twelve 2006
"Your God", song by Project Pitchfork from Dream, Tiresias! 2009   
"Your God", song by Thom Donovan 2013
"Your God", song by Jonathan Davis from Black Labyrinth 2018